Tudor Mill was cotton spinning mill in Ashton-under-Lyne, in the historic county of Lancashire, (now Greater Manchester) England. It was built between 1901 and 1903 for the Ashton Syndicate by Sydney Stott of Oldham. Tudor Mill was next to the Ashton Canal Warehouse at Portland Basin. It ceased spinning cotton in the 1960s and was used as a warehouse until it was destroyed by fire in 1970

Location
Tudor mill was built on the site of the former Portland House and the Stamford brewery, next to the Portland Basin on the final section of the Ashton Canal, where it joined the Huddersfield Narrow Canal.

History
The Minerva Spinning Company Limited was registered in 1891 to build the
Minerva Mill at Whitelands. The directors were Messrs Barlow, Marland, Coop, Newton, Pollitt and Pownall; they were later referred to as the Ashton syndicate. The syndicate went on to build the Rock Mill, Curzon Mill, and then, in 1901, the Tudor Mill. It was built with a capital of £70,000. It opened in May 1903 with 250 workers and 85,464. The Tudor Mill Company became part of the Atlas Mills Limited in the 1920s. Further mills built by the syndicate were Cedar Mill and finally the Texas Mill.

The cotton industry peaked in 1912 when it produced 8 billion yards of cloth. The Great War of 1914–1918 halted the supply of raw cotton, and the British government encouraged its colonies to build mills to spin and weave cotton. The war over, Lancashire never regained its markets. The independent mills were struggling. The Bank of England set up the Lancashire Cotton Corporation in 1929 to attempt to rationalise and save the industry. Atlas Mills Limited was taken over by the LCC in 1929. Thus, Tudor Mill was one of 104 mills brought into LCC ownership, and one of the 53 mills that survived through to 1950, though its spindleage had been reduced to 54,104. It closed in the 1960s and was used as a warehouse.

It was destroyed by fire on 24 June 1970.

Architecture
This was a Sydney Stott building. It was six storeys high built on a basement. It was 11 bays long (65 m), and 40m wide with a corner water tower and a detached engine house. The chimney was round and displayed the two rings that were a trademark of a Sydney Stott mill.

Power
The steam engine was an 1800 hp  triple expansion vertical engine by George Saxon & Co, of Openshaw built in 1906. It had an 18-foot flywheel that operated at 75 rpm. The flywheel drove 40 ropes that transmitted the power to each floor. The cylinders all had Corliss valves. They had a 48" throw, the high pressure was 22½" in diameter, the intermediate was 34" and the low pressure was 56". The air pump was driven from the low-pressure crosshead, there was a Saxon governor on the high-pressure end of the bed.

Equipment
The preparation machinery was provided by Brookes and Doxey, and the mule frames by Hetherington and Sons Ltd. There were 85,464 mule spindles spinning fine counts of twists and weft from Egyptian cotton. By 1948, this had been reduced to 54,104.

Usage
Tudor Mill was used for spinning fine counts of Egyptian cotton, both twists and weft.

Owners
 The Ashton syndicate
 Atlas Mills
 Lancashire Cotton Corporation
 Other

See also

Textile manufacturing
Cotton Mill
Stott

References

Bibliography

External links
 Tudor Mill Aerial Photo 1921 (Britain from Above)
 www.cottontown.org
 www.spinningtheweb.org.uk

Textile mills in Tameside
Buildings and structures in Ashton-under-Lyne
Demolished buildings and structures in Greater Manchester
Textile mills owned by the Lancashire Cotton Corporation